ONE Friday Fights 2: Sangmanee vs. Kulabdam 2 (also known as ONE Lumpinee 2) was a combat sport event produced by ONE Championship that took place on January 27, 2023, at Lumpinee Boxing Stadium in Bangkok, Thailand.

Background 
A bantamweight muay thai rematch between "The Million Dollar Baby" Sangmanee P.K.Saenchai and Kulabdam Sor.Jor.Piek-U-Thai headlined the event. They met previously in a bantamweight muay thai tournament at ONE: No Surrender 3 on July 31, 2020, where Kulabdam won by first-round knockout.

At the weigh-ins, the bantamweight muay thai bout between Pongsiri P.K.Saenchai and Ferzan Cicek was moved to a catchweight of 152 pounds due to the pair failed to make weight in the bantamweight division; Thai-Ngan Le weighed in at 119 pounds, 4 pounds over the atomweight limit. The bout proceeded at catchweight with Le was fined their purse of his purse, which went to his opponent Marie Ruumet.

Results

Bonus awards 
The following fighters received $10,000 bonuses.
Performance of the Night: Yodlekpet Or. Pitisak

See also 

 2023 in ONE Championship
 List of ONE Championship events
 List of current ONE fighters

References 

Events in Bangkok
ONE Championship events
2023 in mixed martial arts
Mixed martial arts in Thailand
Sports competitions in Thailand
January 2023 sports events in Thailand